Courage is a 1921 American silent drama film directed by Sidney Franklin and starring Naomi Childers, Sam De Grasse and Adolphe Menjou. It was distributed by First National Pictures.

Synopsis
In Scotland, a young inventor goes to visit a man who owes him some money only to find him murdered. He is arrested and imprisoned for the crime, while his wife faithfully continues to support him and perfect his invention. Eventually the real culprit is exposed and he is freed to return to her.

Cast
Naomi Childers as Jean Blackmoore
 Sam De Grasse as 	Stephan Blackmoore
 Lionel Belmore as 	Angus Ferguson
 Adolphe Menjou as 	Bruce Ferguson
 Lloyd Whitlock as 'Speedy' Chester
 Alec B. Francis as 	McIntyre
 Ray Howard as Stephan Blackmoore Jr
 Gloria Hope as 	Eve Hamish
 Charles Hill Mailes as 	Oliver Hamish

References

Bibliography
 Munden, Kenneth White. The American Film Institute Catalog of Motion Pictures Produced in the United States, Part 1. University of California Press, 1997.

External links
 

1920s American films
1921 films
1921 drama films
1920s English-language films
American silent feature films
Silent American drama films
American black-and-white films
Films directed by Sidney Franklin
First National Pictures films
Films set in Scotland